Hübsch or Huebsch is a German surname. Notable people with the surname include:

Anton Hübsch (1918–1973), German Luftwaffe pilot
B. W. Huebsch (1876–1964), American publisher
Carl Ludwig Hübsch (born 1966), German musician
 Edward Huebsch (1904–1982), American screenwriter
Eric Hübsch (born 1990), German motorcycle racer
Hadayatullah Hübsch (1946–2011), German writer, journalist and activist
Heinrich Hübsch (1795–1863), German architect
Michael Huebsch (born 1964), American politician

German-language surnames